George Peter "Jiggs" Dahlberg (April 21, 1900 – September 18, 1993) was an American football and basketball coach and college athletics administrator. He served as the head basketball coach at the University of Montana from 1937 to 1942 and again from 1944 to 1955, compiling a record of 221–223. Dahlberg was also the head football coach at Montana for one season, in 1945, tallying a mark of 1–4. He was the athletic director at Montana from 1954 to 1961.

Dahlberg was born on April 21, 1900, in Butte, Montana. He died on September 18, 1993, at the Veterans Administration Hospital in Fort William Henry Harrison, Montana.

Head coaching record

Football

Basketball

References

External links
 

1900 births
1993 deaths
American men's basketball players
Basketball coaches from Montana
Basketball players from Montana
Montana Grizzlies and Lady Griz athletic directors
Montana Grizzlies basketball coaches
Montana Grizzlies basketball players
Montana Grizzlies football coaches
Montana Grizzlies football players
Players of American football from Montana
Sportspeople from Butte, Montana